is a railway station in the city of Murakami, Niigata, Japan, operated by East Japan Railway Company (JR East).

Lines
Echigo-Hayakawa Station is served by the Uetsu Main Line, and is 71.4 kilometers from the starting point of the line at Niitsu Station.

Station layout
The station consists of two ground-level opposed side platforms connected by a footbridge. The station is unattended.

Platforms

History
Echigo-Hayakawa Station opened on 31 July 1924. With the privatization of Japanese National Railways (JNR) on 1 April 1987, the station came under the control of JR East.

Surrounding area

See also
 List of railway stations in Japan

External links
 JR East station information 

Stations of East Japan Railway Company
Railway stations in Niigata Prefecture
Uetsu Main Line
Railway stations in Japan opened in 1924
Murakami, Niigata